Grasshopper Club Küsnacht Lions known as GCK Lions is a Swiss professional ice hockey team founded in 1932. They are currently playing in the Swiss League (SL), Switzerland's second tier ice hockey division, as the affiliate to the ZSC Lions.

The home arena is KEK Küsnacht (capacity 2,800). The team has won one Swiss Championships, in 1966, as well as two championships in the Swiss second division (National League B), in 1946 and 1963. The name of GCK is derived from "Grasshopper Club Zürich" (GCZ) and "SC Küsnacht" (SCK) — two sports clubs which merged to form GCK.

Honors
National League Championship: (1) 1966
NLB Championship: (2) 1946, 1963
Swiss Cup: (1) 1966

References

External links
 GCK Lions official website

Ice hockey teams in Switzerland
Küsnacht